Defending champion Suzanne Lenglen defeated Kitty McKane 6–2, 6–2 in the final to win the ladies' singles tennis title at the 1923 Wimbledon Championships.

Draw

Finals

Top half

Section 1

Section 2

Section 3

Section 4

Bottom half

Section 5

Section 6

Section 7

Section 8

References

External links

Women's Singles
Wimbledon Championship by year – Women's singles
Wimbledon Championships - singles
Wimbledon Championships - singles